Steinunn Sveinsdóttir (1767–1805), was one of the most well known murderers in the history of Iceland alongside
Bjarni Bjarnason (1761-1805).

Case
In 1802, Steinunn Sveinsdóttir and Bjarni Bjarnason mutually murdered their respective spouses in Sjöundá in Iceland. The case became famous as the Morðin á Sjöundá (The Sjöundá Murders). They were both arrested, subjected to torture and sentenced to death. However, it was no longer legal to perform executions on Iceland at that time, so they were to be brought to Norway for their execution. Steinunn Sveinsdóttir died in prison before she could be taken to Norway, but Bjarni Bjarnason was shipped to Norway, where he was executed in 1805.

Popular culture
The case has been the subject of two plays and a novel by Gunnar Gunnarsson, Svartfugl (1938).

References
 http://kvennabladid.is/2013/11/08/serstaed-sakamal-mordin-a-sjounda/
 Bjarki Bjarnason, Bók aldarinnar: íslensk bókmenntasaga, 1901-1950, 1995
 Mitzi M. Brunsdale,  Encyclopedia of Nordic Crime Fiction: Works and Authors of Denmark, 2016
 Gils Guðmundsson, Öldin sem leið: minnisverð tíðindi, 1955

1767 births
18th-century Icelandic people
19th-century Icelandic people
1805 deaths
18th-century Icelandic women
19th-century Icelandic women